Charles Christian Albrecht (1817–1895) was a composer who wrote the music for "Hymne Monégasque," the national anthem of Monaco, based on a previous version by Théophile Bellando de Castro. Lyrics were later added by Louis Notari.

Albrecht had previously served as conductor of the Cercle des Etrangers Orchestre.

References

1817 births
1895 deaths
Monegasque composers
Male composers
19th-century composers
National anthem writers
19th-century male musicians
19th-century musicians